Hypatima sorograpta is a moth in the family Gelechiidae. It was described by Edward Meyrick in 1931. It is found on Tagula Island in Papua New Guinea.

References

Hypatima
Taxa named by Edward Meyrick
Moths described in 1931